The 5th Infantry Division (Korean: 제5보병사단; Hanja: 第五步兵師團), also known as The Key Division (Korean: 열쇠부대) is a unit of the Republic of Korea Army.

Structure 
Headquarters:
Headquarters Company
TOW Company
Recruiting Company
Air Defense Company
Engineer Battalion 'BULL'
Maintenance Battalion 'SEA EAGLE'
Support Transport Battalion
Reconnaissance Battalion 'PEGASUS'
Armored Battalion
Signal Battalion
Military Police Battalion
Medical Battalion
Chemical Battalion
27th Infantry Regiment 'LEOPARD'
35th Infantry Regiment 'LION'
36th Infantry Regiment 'EAGLE'
Artillery Regiment 'WHITE BEAR'
195th Field Artillery Battalion
196th Field Artillery Battalion 'YELLOW DRAGON'
205th Field Artillery Battalion
988th Field Artillery Battalion

Infantry divisions of South Korea